Leslie Stuart Fairclough (30 September 1902 – 7 October 1951) was an English professional rugby league footballer who played in the 1920s and 1930s.

Background
Les Fairclough was born in Prescot, Lancashire, England, and he died aged 49 in St. Helens, Lancashire, England.

Playing career

International honours
Les Fairclough won caps for England while at St. Helens in 1925 against Wales (2 matches), in 1926 against Wales, and Other Nationalities, in 1927 against Wales, in 1928 against Wales (2 matches), in 1930 against Other Nationalities, in 1930 against Other Nationalities, in 1931 against Wales, and won caps for Great Britain while at St. Helens in 1926–27 against New Zealand, in 1928 against Australia (2 matches), and New Zealand (2 matches), and in 1929–30 against Australia.

Challenge Cup Final appearances
Les Fairclough  in St. Helens' 3–10 defeat by Widnes in the 1929–30 Challenge Cup Final at Wembley Stadium, London on Saturday 3 May 1930, in front of a crowd of 36,544.

County Cup Final appearances
Les Fairclough played  and scored a try in St. Helens' 10–2 victory over St Helens Recs in the 1926 Lancashire County Cup Final during the 1926–27 season at Wilderspool Stadium, Warrington on Saturday 20 November 1926.

Honoured at St Helens R.F.C.
Les Fairclough is a St Helens R.F.C. Hall of Fame inductee.

References

External links
Profile at saints.org.uk
 (archived by web.archive.org) Profile at Saints Heritage Society

1902 births
1951 deaths
England national rugby league team players
English rugby league players
Great Britain national rugby league team players
Lancashire rugby league team players
Rugby league centres
Rugby league five-eighths
Rugby league halfbacks
Rugby league players from Prescot
St Helens R.F.C. players